Maria Elena "Lina" Romay (January 16, 1919 - December 17, 2010) was an American actress and singer. She was born in 1919 in Brooklyn, New York, the daughter of Porfirio Romay, then-attache to the Mexican Consulate in Los Angeles.

Romay performed for a time with Xavier Cugat before eventually retiring. She was featured on Cugat Rumba Revue on NBC radio in the early 1940s. Along with Cugat and his orchestra, she appeared in the films You Were Never Lovelier (1942) and Bathing Beauty (1944).

Prior to singing with Cugat, she had sung with Horace Heidt's orchestra, billed as Josette, a Frenchwoman.

She was married to John Lawrence Adams, and later was the third wife of Jay Gould III, whom she married on 30 June 1953.

Romay died at age 91 on December 17, 2010 of natural causes at a hospital in Pasadena, California.

Filmography

References

External links
 
 
 Los Angeles Times Movie Star Mystery Photo of Lina Romay

1919 births
2010 deaths
Latin jazz singers
American musicians of Mexican descent
American women singers
People from Greater Los Angeles
21st-century American women